Group 7 of the 2017 UEFA European Under-21 Championship qualifying competition consisted of six teams: Germany, Russia, Austria, Finland, Azerbaijan, and Faroe Islands. The composition of the nine groups in the qualifying group stage was decided by the draw held on 5 February 2015.

The group was played in home-and-away round-robin format. The group winners qualified directly for the final tournament, while the runners-up advanced to the play-offs if they were one of the four best runners-up among all nine groups (not counting results against the sixth-placed team).

Standings

Matches
Times are CEST (UTC+2) for dates between 29 March and 24 October 2015 and between 27 March and 29 October 2016, for other dates times are CET (UTC+1).

Goalscorers
9 goals

 Michael Gregoritsch

7 goals

 Davie Selke

5 goals

 Maximilian Arnold
 Max Meyer
 Leroy Sané

3 goals

 Alessandro Schöpf
 Fredrik Lassas
 Ramil Sheydayev

2 goals

 Kevin Friesenbichler
 Kerem Behnke
 Mahir Madatov
 Vahid Hambo
 Moshtagh Yaghoubi
 Serge Gnabry
 Joshua Kimmich
 Timo Werner
 Alexey Yevseyev
 Ilya Zuyev

1 goal

 Nikola Dovedan
 Florian Grillitsch
 Arnel Jakupovic
 Philipp Lienhart
 Ylli Sallahi
 Louis Schaub
 Christian Schoissengeyr
 Dominik Wydra
 Elshan Abdullayev
 Magsad Isayev
 Rahil Mammadov
 Azer Salahli
 Gestur Bogason Dam
 Hákun Edmundsson
 Ári Jónsson
 Joel Mero
 Daniel O'Shaughnessy
 Simon Skrabb
 Jasse Tuominen
 Mikko Viitikko
 Julian Brandt
 Leon Goretzka
 Janik Haberer
 Levin Öztunalı
 Niklas Süle
 Dmitri Barinov
 Igor Bezdenezhnykh
 Maksim Karpov
 Nikolay Komlichenko
 Vitali Lystsov
 Maksim Paliyenko
 Andrei Panyukov
 Aleksandr Tashayev

1 own goal

 Sonni Nattestad (against Germany)
 Teitur Olsen (against Finland)
 Sauli Väisänen (against Germany)

References

External links
Standings and fixtures at UEFA.com

Group 7